Premier Li may refer to:
Li Keqiang (born 1955), 7th Premier of China
Li Peng (1928–2019), 4th Premier of China

See also
Prime Minister Lee (disambiguation)